Dreamers is a Bosnian short documentary film produced by the East West Theatre Company and directed by Nermin Hamzagic.

The film follows the story of Samir Karić and Amir Muminović, young hip-hop artists from the village of Hajvazi, near the north-eastern Bosnian town of Kalesija. The mayor's son gave the hip-hop duo a bad beating because of their song which criticized municipal authorities. A newspaper report on the incident intrigues East West Theatre Company, a theatre and film production company from Sarajevo. Shortly after the incident, Samir and Amir become part of the cast of Class Enemy (play) a play about disenfranchised youth in a violent secondary school in Bosnia and Herzegovina. Samir and Amir eventually end up touring the world with the East West Theatre Company's production.

The film Dreamers is devised as a road movie.

References

2009 films
Bosnian-language films
Culture in Sarajevo
Films set in Bosnia and Herzegovina